Andre Colebrook (born March 8, 1994) is a male sprinter from Eleuthera in The Bahamas, who mainly competes in the 400m Hurdles 400m and 800. He attended Central Eleuthera High School in Eleuthera, before going on to compete for Essex County College and
Southeastern Louisiana University. 

Colebrook competed at the 2019 Pan American Games and the 2017 IAAF World Relays.

Personal bests

References

External links
 World Athletics
 Southern Louisiana

1994 births
Living people
Bahamian male sprinters
Bahamian male hurdlers
People from Eleuthera
Southeastern Louisiana University alumni
Junior college men's track and field athletes in the United States
Essex County College alumni
Pan American Games competitors for the Bahamas
Athletes (track and field) at the 2019 Pan American Games